Oscar II (Oscar Fredrik; 21 January 1829 – 8 December 1907) was King of Sweden from 1872 until his death in 1907 and King of Norway from 1872 to 1905.

Oscar was the son of King Oscar I and Queen Josephine. He inherited the Swedish and Norwegian thrones when his brother died in 1872. Oscar II ruled during a time when both countries were undergoing a period of industrialization and rapid technological progress. His reign also saw the gradual decline of the Union of Sweden and Norway, which culminated in its dissolution in 1905. In 1905, the throne of Norway was transferred to his grandnephew Prince Carl of Denmark under the regnal name Haakon VII. When Oscar died in 1907, he was succeeded in Sweden by his eldest son, Gustaf V.

Oscar II is the paternal great-great-grandfather of King Carl XVI Gustaf of Sweden. Queen Margrethe II of Denmark is his descendant through his son Gustaf V. King Harald V of Norway; King Philippe of the Belgians; and Henri, Grand Duke of Luxembourg are also descendants of Oscar II, all through his third son Prince Carl, Duke of Västergötland.

Early life

Oscar Fredrik was born in Stockholm on 21 January 1829, the third of four sons of Crown Prince Oscar and Josephine of Leuchtenberg. Upon his birth, he was created Duke of Östergötland. During his childhood he was placed in the care of the royal governess, Countess Christina Ulrika Taube.

Prince Oscar entered the Royal Swedish Navy as a midshipman at the age of eleven, and was appointed junior lieutenant in July 1845. Later he studied at Uppsala University, where he distinguished himself in mathematics. On 13 December 1848,  was made an honorary member of the Royal Swedish Academy of Sciences.

A distinguished writer and musical amateur himself, King Oscar proved a generous friend of learning, and did much to encourage the development of education throughout his dominions. In 1858 a collection of his lyrical and narrative poems, Memorials of the Swedish Fleet, published anonymously, obtained the second prize of the Swedish Academy. His "Contributions to the Military History of Sweden in the Years 1711, 1712, 1713", originally appeared in the Annals of the academy, and were printed separately in 1865.  His works, which included his speeches, translations of Herder's Cid and Goethe's Torquato Tasso, and a play, Castle Cronberg, were collected in two volumes in 1875–76, and a larger edition, in three volumes, appeared in 1885–88.

In 1859, Prince Oscar became heir-presumptive to the thrones of Sweden and Norway, as his eldest brother King Charles XV of Sweden/Charles IV of Norway was without a legitimate heir, having lost his only son, Prince Carl Oscar, Duke of Södermanland, to pneumonia in 1854. His second elder brother, Prince Gustaf, Duke of Uppland, had before died of typhoid fever in 1852.

King of Sweden and Norway

Oscar II became King on 18 September 1872, upon the death of his brother, Charles XV who died without an heir. At his accession, he adopted as his motto Brödrafolkens väl / Broderfolkenes Vel ("The Welfare of the Brother Peoples"). While the King, his family and the Royal Court resided mostly in Sweden, Oscar II made the effort of learning to be fluent in Norwegian and from the very beginning realized the essential difficulties in the maintenance of the union between the two countries.

Foreign and domestic statecraft

His acute intelligence and his aloofness from the dynastic considerations affecting most European sovereigns (both his paternal and maternal grandfathers were French military commanders who served under Napoleon I) gave the king considerable weight as an arbitrator in international questions. At the request of the United Kingdom, Germany, and the United States in 1889 he appointed the Chief Justice of Samoa under the Treaty of Berlin, and he was again called on to arbitrate in Samoan affairs in 1899.

In 1897 he was empowered to appoint a fifth arbitrator if necessary in the Venezuelan dispute, and he was called on to act as umpire in the Anglo-American arbitration treaty that was quashed by the United States Senate. He won many friends in the United Kingdom by his outspoken and generous support of Britain at the time of the Second Boer War (1899–1902), expressed in a declaration printed in The Times of 2 May 1900, when continental opinion was almost universally hostile.

He remained a strong supporter of the Navy throughout his life, and frequently visited ships of the fleet. When the coastal defence ship  was launched, he even signed his name on the vessel's aft main gun tower.

The office of Prime Minister of Sweden was instituted in 1876. Louis De Geer became the first head of government in Sweden to use this title. The most known and powerful first minister of the Crown during the reign of Oscar was the conservative estate owner Erik Gustaf Boström. Boström served as Prime Minister in 1891–1900 and 1902–1905. He was trusted and respected by Oscar II, who had much difficulty approving someone else as prime minister. Over a period of time, the King gave Boström a free hand to select his own ministers without much royal involvement. It was an arrangement (unintentional by both the King and Boström) that furthered the road to parliamentarism.

Science and the arts

His Easter hymn and some other of his poems are familiar throughout the Scandinavian countries. His work on Charles XII of Sweden were translated into English in 1879. In 1881 he founded the world's first open-air museum, at Bygdøy, located next to his summer residence near Oslo (back then known as Christiania). In 1885 he published his Address to the Academy of Music, and a translation of one of his essays on music appeared in Literature in May 1900. He had a valuable collection of printed and manuscript music, which was readily accessible to the historical student of music.

Being a theater lover, he commissioned a new opera house to be built by Axel Anderberg for the Royal Swedish Opera which was inaugurated on 19 September 1898. It remains as the home of that institution.
Oscar II once told playwright Henrik Ibsen that his Ghosts was "not a good play". As he was dying, he requested that the theatres not be closed on account of his death. His wishes were respected.

In 1889, to commemorate the 60th birthday of King Oscar II of Sweden and Norway, a contest was held to produce the best research in celestial mechanics pertaining to the stability of the solar system, a particularly relevant n-body problem. The winner was declared to be Henri Poincare, a professor at the University of Paris.

King Oscar II was an enthusiast of Arctic exploration. Along with Swedish millionaire Oscar Dickson and Russian magnate Aleksandr Mikhaylovich Sibiryakov, he was the patron of a number of pioneering Arctic expeditions in the 1800s. Among the ventures the king sponsored, the most important are Adolf Erik Nordenskiöld's explorations to the Russian Arctic and Greenland, and Fridtjof Nansen's Polar journey on the Fram.

Oscar was also a generous sponsor of the sciences and personally funded the Vega Expedition, which was the first Arctic expedition to navigate through the Northeast Passage, the sea route between Europe and Asia through the Arctic Ocean, and the first voyage to circumnavigate Eurasia. Oscar was also particularly interested in mathematics. He set up a contest, on the occasion of his 60th birthday, for "an important discovery in the realm of higher mathematical analysis".

Death
The political events which led up to the peaceful dissolution of the union between Norway and Sweden in 1905 could hardly have been attained but for the tact and patience of the king himself. He was dethroned on 7 June 1905 by the Storting and renounced the Norwegian throne on 26 October. He declined, indeed, to permit any prince of his house to become king of Norway, but better relations between the two countries were restored before his death. Oscar II died in Stockholm on 8 December 1907 at 9:10 am.

Marriage and children

On 6 June 1857 he married in Wiesbaden-Biebrich, Duchy of Nassau (located in present-day Hessen, Germany) Princess Sophia Wilhelmina, the youngest daughter of Duke William of Nassau and Princess Pauline of Württemberg. They had four sons:

 King Gustaf V (1858–1950)
 Prince Oscar, Duke of Gotland, later known as Prince Oscar Bernadotte, Count of Wisborg (1859–1953)
 Prince Carl, Duke of Västergötland (1861–1951)
 Prince Eugen, Duke of Närke (1865–1947)

His eldest son Gustaf was Duke of Värmland and succeeded him as King Gustaf V of Sweden from 1907 until 1950, married Princess Victoria of Baden and they had three sons. His second son, Prince Oscar, lost his rights of succession to the throne upon his unequal marriage in 1888 to a former lady-in-waiting, Ebba Munck af Fulkila, and was granted the title of Prince Bernadotte first in Sweden, and from 1892 in Luxembourg, where he also was created Count of Wisborg as an hereditary title for his marital progeny (Adolphe, Grand Duke of Luxembourg, was the half-brother of his mother, Queen Sophia). The other sons of Oscar II were Prince Carl, Duke of Västergötland who married Princess Ingeborg of Denmark; and Prince Eugén, Duke of Närke, who was well known as an artist and remained a bachelor all his life.

Alleged extramarital children

Oscar II is also suspected to have had several extramarital children, of which at least five are named:
 Anna Hofman-Uddgren (1868–1947) by Emma Hammarström (1849–1910)
 Elin Esping Smitz (1878–1960) by Paulina Mathilda Esping (1858–1878)
 Knut August Ekstam (born 1878, in U.S.A. 1903, death unknown) by Marie Friberg (1852–1934) 
 Florence Stephens (1881–1979) by Elisabeth Kreüger Stephens (1858–1911)
 Nils Teodor Ekstam (1889–1954) also by Friberg above

However, unlike his father, Oscar II never officially recognized any illegitimate children of his.

Honours 

National
 Knight and Commander of the Seraphim, 21 January 1829
 Knight of the Order of Charles XIII, 21 January 1829
 Commander Grand Cross of the Sword, 21 January 1829
 Commander Grand Cross of the Polar Star, 21 January 1829
 Commander Grand Cross of the Order of Vasa, 15 June 1866
 Grand Cross of St. Olav, with Collar, 21 August 1847
 Founder and Master of the Order of the Norwegian Lion, 21 January 1904 – 26 October 1905

Foreign

Legacy
The name and portrait of Oscar II have been used as a trademark for King Oscar sardines in Norway since 1902 (which remains the only brand to have once obtained his "royal permission"
) as well as gingerbread cookies (pepparkakor) and other bakery products made by Göteborgs Kex in Sweden.

Ancestry

Heraldry

References

Further reading

External links

 The Royal Norwegian Order of St Olav – H.M. King Oscar II the former Grand Master of the Order

|-

1829 births
1907 deaths
19th-century Swedish monarchs
20th-century Swedish monarchs
19th-century Norwegian monarchs
20th-century Norwegian monarchs
People from Stockholm
House of Bernadotte
Swedish Lutherans
Norwegian monarchs
Swedish people of French descent
Uppsala University alumni
Members of the Royal Swedish Academy of Sciences
Swedish monarchs of German descent
Burials at Riddarholmen Church
Swedish Freemasons
Dethroned monarchs
Dukes of Östergötland

Grand Masters of the Order of Charles XIII
Knights of the Order of Charles XIII
Commanders Grand Cross of the Order of the Sword
Commanders Grand Cross of the Order of the Polar Star
Grand Crosses of the Order of Vasa
Knights of the Order of the Norwegian Lion
Grand Crosses of the Order of Saint Stephen of Hungary
Recipients of the Cross of Honour of the Order of the Dannebrog
Grand Croix of the Légion d'honneur
Recipients of the Order of the Netherlands Lion
3
3
3
Recipients of the Order of the White Eagle (Russia)
Recipients of the Order of St. Anna, 1st class
Knights of the Golden Fleece of Spain
Extra Knights Companion of the Garter
Sons of kings
Grand Crosses of the Order of Saint-Charles